The 1938 Palestine Cup (HaGavia HaEretz-Israeli) was the ninth season of Israeli Football Association's nationwide football cup competition. The defending holders were Hapoel Tel Aviv.

For the third time since the beginning of the competition, the two senior Tel Aviv clubs, Hapoel and Maccabi met in the final. Hapoel won 2–1, securing its fourth cup and its second double.

Results

First round

Quarter-finals

Semi-finals

Replay

Second replay

Final

References
100 Years of Football 1906-2006, Elisha Shohat (Israel), 2006

External links
 Israel Football Association website 

Israel State Cup
Cup
Israel State Cup seasons